Sir David Robert Campbell Durie,  (born 21 August 1944)  is a retired British civil servant, whose last major public appointment was as Governor of Gibraltar.

Early life
Born into a family with a military tradition, Durie grew up in Scotland. Together with his twin brother, Ian (1944–2005), Durie was educated at Fettes College. He read Natural Sciences at the University of Oxford.

Career
Durie joined the Ministry of Technology in 1966 before going on to work in various posts at the OECD, the Cabinet Office and the Department of Trade and Industry. In 1991 he became Minister and Deputy UK Permanent Representative to the European Community in Brussels and in 1995 he returned to the Department of Trade and Industry before leaving the Home Civil Service in 2000.

He served as Governor of Gibraltar from 2000 to 2003.

He is a former Governor of The Queen's School, Kew.

Personal life
Durie lives in Kew, London. He is married to Susan (née Weller), and has three daughters.

Honours and awards
Durie was appointed a Companion of the Order of St Michael and St George (CMG) in the 1995 New Year Honours, and promoted to a Knight Commander of the same Order (KCMG) in the 2003 New Year Honours. He was appointed a Knight of the Venerable Order of St. John (KStJ) in 2000. Durie was also invested as Knight Commander of the Royal Order of Francis I (KCFO) by Prince Carlo, Duke of Castro (then Duke of Calabria) in 2003.

References

External links
Durie family website

|-
 

Living people
1944 births
Alumni of Christ Church, Oxford
Civil servants in the Cabinet Office
Civil servants in the Department of Trade and Industry
Civil servants in the Ministry of Technology
Governors of Gibraltar
Knights Commander of the Order of St Michael and St George
Knights of the Order of St John
Civil servants from Glasgow
People educated at Fettes College
School governors